This is a list of VTV dramas released in 1998.

←1997 - 1998 - 1999→

VTV Tet dramas
These films were released on VTV channel during Tet holiday. In this time, all of the channels were merged with a single broadcast schedule.

VTV1 Unstable time slot on Friday night for Vietnamese dramas
Following the previous year, the Friday night (around 21:00) on VTV1 was spent to air Vietnamese films more often than the other time slots but it was unstable. It sometimes was used as an extension for foreign drama time slots. In some other cases, the broadcast schedule for several Vietnamese dramas was expanded to non-Fridays. The list below includes some of the films that did not air on Fridays.

Note: The time slot was delayed from 12 Jun to 3 Jul due to the broadcast schedule for 1998 FIFA World Cup.

For The First Time On VTV3 Screen dramas
These dramas were aired under the name of the program For The First Time On VTV3 Screen (Vietnamese: Lần đầu tiên trên màn ảnh VTV3).

Since 31 Mar, the program was moved from Wednesday late afternoon time slot to Tuesday night time slot (around 21:15).

VTV3 Sunday Literature & Art dramas
These dramas air in early Sunday afternoon on VTV3 as a part of the program Sunday Literature & Art (Vietnamese: Văn nghệ Chủ Nhật).

See also
 List of dramas broadcast by Vietnam Television (VTV)
 List of dramas broadcast by Hanoi Radio Television (HanoiTV)
 List of dramas broadcast by Vietnam Digital Television (VTC)

References

External links
VTV.gov.vn – Official VTV Website 
VTV.vn – Official VTV Online Newspaper 

Vietnam Television original programming
1998 in Vietnamese television